USS Edsall (DD-219), was a , the first of two United States Navy ships named after Seaman Norman Eckley Edsall (1873–1899). She was sunk by a combined Japanese air and sea attack, approximately 200 miles east of Christmas Island on 1 March 1942.

Construction and commissioning
Edsall was laid down by the William Cramp & Sons Ship and Engine Building Company on 15 September 1919, launched on 29 July 1920 by Mrs Bessie Edsall Bracey, sister of Seaman Edsall, and commissioned on 26 November 1920.

Service history
Edsall sailed from Philadelphia on 6 December 1920 for San Diego, California for shakedown. She arrived at San Diego 11 January 1921, and remained on the United States West Coast until December, engaging in battle practice and gunnery drills with fleet units. Returning to Charleston, South Carolina, 28 December, Edsall departed 26 May 1922 for the Mediterranean.

Arriving at Constantinople on 28 June, Edsall joined the U.S. Naval Detachment in Turkish Waters to protect American interests as the Near East was in turmoil with civil strife in Russia, and Greece at war with Turkey.

She was part of the international effort to alleviate the postwar famine in eastern Europe. She helped evacuate refugees, furnishing a center of communications for the Near East and standing by for emergencies. When the Turks expelled the Anatolian Greeks from Smyrna (Izmir), Edsall was one of the American destroyers which evacuated refugees. On 14 September 1922, she took 607 refugees off  in Smyrna and transported them to Salonika, returning to Smyrna on 16 September to act as flagship for the naval forces there. In October she carried refugees from Smyrna to Mytilene on Lesbos Island. She made repeated visits to ports in Turkey, Bulgaria, Russia, Greece, Egypt, Mandate Palestine, the Syrian Federation, Tunisia, Dalmatia, and Italy, and kept up gunnery and torpedo practice with her sisters until her return to Boston, Massachusetts, for an overhaul on 26 July 1924.

Edsall sailed to join the U.S. Asiatic Fleet on 3 January 1925, joining in battle practice and maneuvers at Guantanamo Bay, San Diego, and Pearl Harbor before arriving at Shanghai on 22 June. She was to become a fixture of the Asiatic Fleet on the China coast, in the Philippines and Japan. Her primary duty was protection of American interests in the Far East. She served during the civil war in China, and the early part of the Sino-Japanese War. Battle practice, maneuvers and diplomacy took her most frequently to Shanghai, Chefoo, Hankow, Hong Kong, Nanking, Kobe, Bangkok, and Manila. In late October 1927, Edsall visited the Siamese capital Bangkok, and had three of the Royal Princesses aboard for tea.  In return Edsalls skipper, Commander Jules James, was given an engraved silver cigarette case by the Thai Royal Family.

World War II
On 25 November 1941, two days in advance of the "war warning" which predicted that hostile Japanese action in the Pacific was imminent, Admiral Hart, commander of the Asiatic Fleet, dispatched Destroyer Division (DesDiv) 57 (and Edsall) with the destroyer tender , to Balikpapan, Borneo, to disperse the surface ships of his fleet from their vulnerable position in Manila Bay.

When the Japanese attacked Pearl Harbor on 7 December 1941 (local date 8 December 1941 due to the International Date Line), Edsall was en route to Batavia (now [[Jakarta, Indonesia) with her sister ships when word was received.

Edsall and her division joined the heavy cruiser  and other US units at Surabaya on 15 December 1941 and escorted shipping retiring to the relative safety of Darwin, Australia. During the first week of 1942 Edsall escorted the Pensacola Convoy from Torres Strait back to Darwin.

On the morning of 20 January 1942 the Imperial Japanese Navy submarine  sighted Trinity, and misidentifed her as a transport. I-123 fired four Type 89 torpedoes at  shortly after 0630. The sound man aboard I-123 reported hearing one torpedo hit, but all four torpedoes had missed; Trinity had sighted three of them and reported the attack. Alden then searched for I-123, made a sound contact and conducted a brief depth charge attack at 06:41 before losing contact and abandoning the search.

Continuing to escort convoys in northern Australian waters, Edsall was damaged when one of her own depth charges exploded during an anti-submarine attack on 23 January 1942 in the shallow —  — Howard Channel.

On 3 February Edsall and other American units of ABDA moved up to Tjilatjap, Java in order to be closer to the combat theater and to replenish. She continued as a patrol vessel off southern Java. On 23 February 1942 she and the old gunboat  operated off Tjilatjap on antisubmarine patrols.

On 26 February she steamed from Tjilatjap with her sister ship  to rendezvous with the converted seaplane tender , which was bringing in P-40E fighters and U.S. Army Air Forces (USAAF) personnel for the defense of Java. On 27 February, the three ships were attacked by sixteen Mitsubishi G4M "Betty" bombers of the Imperial Japanese Navy Air Service's Takao Kōkūtai, led by Lieutenant Jiro Adachi, flying out of Den Pasar airfield on Bali, escorted by fifteen Mitsubishi A6M2 Reisen (Zero) fighters. The attack damaged Langley so severely that she had to be scuttled. Edsall picked up 177 survivors, and Whipple 308.

More Japanese bombers forced Edsall and other ships to head for open sea. They headed directly south into the Indian Ocean for the rest of 28 February in high winds and heavy seas; between 0430 (USN/local time) and 0815 on 1 March all Langley'''s crew were transferred to Pecos. Whipple then set off for Cocos as protection for the tanker Belita. Pecos, carrying about 700 survivors from Langley,  and Houston, plus assorted stragglers, was ordered to Australia.Edsall was directed to return to Tjilatjap, carrying USAAF pilots and ground crew who had been passengers on Langley. The USAAF personnel were to assemble and fly 27 disassembled and crated P-40 fighters which had been delivered to Tjilatjap aboard the cargo ship . Following orders, at 0830 she headed back to the northeast for Java.

Last engagement of EdsallPecos was detected later that morning by air patrols from the carriers of Japanese Vice Admiral Chūichi Nagumo's Kido Butai (or KdB) and came under heavy air attack. For some time she sent out distress calls to any Allied ships in the area, as it was assumed the ship would probably be lost. Whipple, less than  distant, received some of these calls, but was too far away to return quickly. , a troopship many hundreds of miles away in the Indian Ocean also read some of the signals. At approximately 1548 hours Pecos sank after being attacked for several hours by four waves of IJN dive-bombers from Nagumo's KdB.

At 1550 hours (USN/local time) the Japanese task force spotted a single "light cruiser" about  behind the force, approximately  SSE of Christmas Island; this was in fact Edsall. At about 1603 hours she was seen from the Japanese heavy cruiser , and within five minutes the cruiser opened fire with her  guns. Fifteen minutes later the battleships of Vice Admiral Gunichi Mikawa's Sentai 3/1 (Hiei and Kirishima) opened fire with their main battery of  guns at extreme range.

The Japanese surface vessels (2 cruisers, 2 battleships) fired 1,335 shells at Edsall that afternoon, with no more than one or two hits, which failed to stop the destroyer. The dive bombers were led by Lieutenants Ogawa, Kobayashi, and Koite respectively. Their  bombs immobilised Edsall with one hit and one miss near enough to do damage.

At 17:22 the Japanese ships resumed firing on the destroyer. A Japanese cameraman, probably on the cruiser , filmed about 90 seconds of her destruction. (A single frame from this film was culled for use as a propaganda photo later, misidentified as "the British destroyer HMS Pope".)

The Japanese report after action described the sinking of Edsall as a fiasco. The Japanese Navy revised rules of engagement for battleships and cruisers against destroyers.

The fate of Edsall survivors
Japanese Imperial Navy officers aboard the cruiser Chikuma several years later reported that a number of men may have survived the sinking of Edsall as they were found in the water on liferafts, cutters or clinging to debris. However, due to a submarine alert, the Japanese only stopped long enough to rescue a handful (the Japanese word is jakkan) before they received orders to retire, leaving the others to perish in the Indian Ocean.

Onboard Chikuma the survivors were interrogated by their captors; the name of their ship was recorded as "the old destroyer E-do-soo-ru".  After a few days, the details of these interrogations were provided to the other ships of Nagumo's Kido Butai during their return journey. There is some suggestion that the cruiser Tone may have picked up a survivor or two as well, but there is no confirming evidence of this. The Americans were held on Chikuma for the next ten days before returning to the Japanese force's advance base on 11 March 1942.

Mass grave
Two graves contained 34 decapitated bodies, among which were the remains of six Edsall crewmen and what are thought to be five USAAF personnel from Langley, along with Javanese, Chinese, and Dutch merchant sailors from the Dutch merchant-ship Modjokerto, sunk on the same day and in the same general area as Edsall. The American bodies were reinterred in U.S. cemeteries between December 1949 and March 1950.

War crimes trials conducted in 1946–1948 concerning other murders that occurred in or near Kendari by IJN personnel recorded fragmentary information about the killings of Edsall survivors, but were not recognized as such by Allied investigators, and were not pursued.

AwardsEdsall received two battle stars for her World War II service.

L. Ron Hubbard claim
L. Ron Hubbard claimed that he had served on Edsall during World War II and that, following her sinking, he swam to shore and remained in the jungle as the ship's sole survivor. He claimed that this is where he was during the bombing of Pearl Harbor, although Edsall had been sunk in 1942, and the U.S. Navy has no record of his service on the ship. Navy records show that Hubbard was in training in New York when the war broke out. He was supposed to be posted to the Philippines, but his ship was diverted to Australia. There he angered the US naval attaché for assuming "unauthorized duties"; he was relieved from his assignment and returned to the United States.

References

 Primary source: 
 

External links
Movement record of Tone'' from combinedfleet.com
The Sinking of the Edsall
A SHIP TO REMEMBER: USS EDSALL (DD 219)
http://www.navsource.org/archives/05/219.htm
Roll of Honor
Last Stand at Sea 1942 - The USS Edsall Mystery - War Stories with Mark Felton

Edsall (DD-219)
Edsall (DD-219)
Ships built by William Cramp & Sons
World War II shipwrecks in the Java Sea
1920 ships
Maritime incidents in March 1942